What a Cartoon! (later known as The What a Cartoon! Show and The Cartoon Cartoon Show) is an American animated anthology series created by Fred Seibert for Cartoon Network. The shorts were produced by Hanna-Barbera Productions; by the end of the run, a Cartoon Network Studios production tag was added to some shorts to signal they were original to the network. The project consisted of 48 cartoons, intended to return creative power to animators and artists, by recreating the atmospheres that spawned the iconic cartoon characters of the mid-20th century. Each of the shorts mirrored the structure of a theatrical cartoon, with each film being based on an original storyboard drawn and written by its artist or creator. Three of the cartoons were paired together into a half-hour episode.

What a Cartoon! premiered under the World Premiere Toons title on February 20, 1995. The premiere aired alongside a special episode of Cartoon Network's Space Ghost Coast to Coast called "World Premiere Toon-In", which features interviews with animators Craig McCracken, Pat Ventura, Van Partible, Eugene Mattos, Genndy Tartakovsky, and Dian Parkinson. During the original run of the shorts, the series was retitled to The What a Cartoon! Show and later to The Cartoon Cartoon Show until the final shorts aired on August 23, 2002.

The series is influential for helping to revive television animation in the 1990s and serving as a launching point for the Cartoon Network animated television series Dexter's Laboratory, Johnny Bravo, Courage the Cowardly Dog, Cow and Chicken, I Am Weasel, and The Powerpuff Girls. Once it had several original shorts, those became the first Cartoon Cartoons. Following Fred Seibert's departure in 1997, Sam Register took control of the show in 1998, and by 2000, rebranded it into The Cartoon Cartoon Show, with more Cartoon Network originals being spawned from the showcase, including Sheep in the Big City, Grim & Evil (consisting of The Grim Adventures of Billy & Mandy and Evil Con Carne), Whatever Happened to... Robot Jones?, Codename: Kids Next Door, and Megas XLR. From 2005 to 2008, The Cartoon Cartoon Show was revived as a block for reruns of older Cartoon Cartoons that had been phased out by the network.

History

Origins and production 

Fred Seibert became president of Hanna-Barbera Cartoons in 1992 and helped guide the struggling animation studio into its greatest output in years with shows like 2 Stupid Dogs and SWAT Kats: The Radical Squadron. Seibert wanted the studio to produce short cartoons, in the vein of the Golden age of American animation. Although a project consisting of 48 shorts would cost twice as much as a normal series, Seibert's pitch to Cartoon Network involved promising 48 chances to "succeed or fail", opened up possibilities for new original programming, and offered several new shorts to the thousands already present in the Turner Entertainment library. According to Seibert, quality did not matter much to the cable operators distributing the struggling network, they were more interested in promising new programs.

With Turner Broadcasting CEO Ted Turner and Seibert's boss Scott Sassa on board, the studio fanned out across the world to spread the word that the studio was in an "unprecedented phase", in which animators had a better idea what cartoons should be than executives and Hanna-Barbera supported them. The company started taking pitches in earnest in 1993 and received over 5,000 pitches for the 48 slots. The diversity in the filmmakers included those from
various nationalities, race, and gender. Seibert later described his hope for an idealistic diversity as "The wider the palette of creative influences, the wider and bigger the audiences."

Seibert's idea for the project was influenced heavily by Looney Tunes. Hanna-Barbera founders and chairmen William Hanna and Joseph Barbera, as well as veteran animator Friz Freleng, taught Seibert how the shorts of the Golden Age of American animation were produced. John Kricfalusi, creator of The Ren & Stimpy Show, became a teacher of sorts for Seibert and was the first person Seibert called while looking for new talent for the project.

As was the custom in live action film and television, the company did not pay each creator for the storyboard submitted and pitched. For the first time in the studio's history, individual creators could retain their rights, and earn royalties on their creations. While most in the industry scoffed at the idea, encouragement, according to Seibert, came from the cartoonists who flocked to Hanna-Barbera with original ideas.

Format 
The format for What a Cartoon! was ambitious, as no one had ever attempted anything similar in the television animation era. The shorts produced would be a product of the original cartoonists' vision, with no executive intervention: for example, even the music would be an individually crafted score. Each 7-minute short would debut, by itself, as a stand-alone cartoon or a stand-alone series on Cartoon Network. Three of the 7-minute cartoons are paired together into a half-hour episode. Seibert explained the project's goal in a 2007 blog post: "We didn’t care what the sitcom trends were, what Nickelodeon was doing, what the sales departments wanted. [...] We wanted cartoons."

Crew 

The What a Cartoon! staff had creators from Europe (Bruno Bozzetto), Asia (Achiu So), and the United States (Jerry Reynolds and colleague Seth MacFarlane). The crew also contained young series first-timers (like Genndy Tartakovsky, Craig McCracken, Rob Renzetti, Butch Hartman, and John R. Dilworth), but veterans as well (like Don Jurwich, Jerry Eisenberg, and Ralph Bakshi). In addition to the veterans, William Hanna and Joseph Barbera each produced two shorts each for What a Cartoon!. Many of the key crew members from previous Hanna-Barbera series 2 Stupid Dogs joined the team of What a Cartoon! as well.

Many of its crew members later went on to write and direct for Dexter's Laboratory, Johnny Bravo, Cow and Chicken, I Am Weasel, and The Powerpuff Girls, including those named above. The Kitchen Casanova director John McIntyre is particularly known for directing several Dexter episodes. Ralph Bakshi's series (Malcom and Melvin) was considered too risqué to be shown. It has been rumored that John Kricfalusi was slated to direct several new What a Cartoon! shorts of his own (produced by his production company, Spümcø). However, both Yogi Bear-influenced cartoons were commissioned separately by Seibert, and instead premiered as their own: Boo Boo Runs Wild and A Day in the Life of Ranger Smith both premiered in 1999.

Inspired by Seibert's interest in the modern rock posters of Frank Kozik, each of the shows' creators worked with the internal Hanna-Barbera Creative Corps creative director Bill Burnett, and senior art director Jesse Stagg, to craft a series of high quality, limited edition, fluorescent art posters. The Corps launched a prolonged guerrilla mailing campaign, targeting animation heavyweights and critics leading up to the launch of World Premiere Toons. The first poster campaign of its kind introduced the world to the groundbreaking new stable of characters.

Broadcast 
The first cartoon from the What a Cartoon! project broadcast in its entirety was The Powerpuff Girls in "Meat Fuzzy Lumkins", which made its world premiere on Monday, February 20, 1995, during a television special called the World Premiere Toon-In (termed "President's Day Nightmare" by its producers, Williams Street). The special was hosted by Space Ghost and the cast of Space Ghost Coast to Coast, and featured comic interviews and a mock contest with the creators of the various cartoons. The Toon-In was simulcast on Cartoon Network, TBS Superstation, and TNT. To promote the shorts, Cartoon Network's marketing department came up with the concept of "Dive-In Theater" in 1995 to showcase the 48 cartoon shorts. The cartoons were shown at water parks and large municipal swimming pools, treating kids and their parents to exclusive poolside screenings on 9' x 12' movie screens.

Beginning February 26, 1995, each What a Cartoon! short began to premiere on Sunday nights, promoted as World Premiere Toons. Every week after the premiere, Cartoon Network showcased a different World Premiere Toons made by a different artist. After an acclimation of cartoons, the network packaged the shorts as a half-hour show titled World Premiere Toons: The Next Generation, featuring reruns of the original shorts but also new premieres.

Eventually, all of the cartoons were compiled into one program which was used the name World Premiere Toons: The Show until the summer of 1996 when it started bearing the name of the original project: The What a Cartoon! Show. The show's initial premieres for each short preceded Cartoon Network's Sunday night movie block, Mr. Spim's Cartoon Theatre. The shorts continued to air on Sundays until 1997, when the network moved the shorts to Wednesdays at 9pm. Following the premiere of Johnny Bravo and Cow and Chicken as full series in July 1997, the series shifted to Thursday nights, where it remained.

The What a Cartoon! Show continued airing new episodes on Thursdays until November 28, 1997, when the final short of the 48 contracted during Seibert's era aired. In 1998, Cartoon Network debuted two new short pilots and advertised them as World Premiere Toons: Mike, Lu & Og and Kenny and the Chimp, both of which were produced by outside studios and produced after Time Warner's acquisition of Turner Broadcasting in 1996. The two pilots were later compiled into The Cartoon Cartoon Show, while both shorts eventually garnered their own series, Mike, Lu & Og in 1999 and Codename: Kids Next Door in 2002. One pilot entitled King Crab: Space Crustacean, which released in 1999, was also retconned into The Cartoon Cartoon Show anthology.

On June 9, 2000, The What a Cartoon! Show was relaunched as The Cartoon Cartoon Show. In this new format, it aired reruns and new episodes of the full-series Cartoon Cartoons, as well as new Cartoon Cartoon shorts and old WAC! shorts. From 2000 to 2001, the pilot shorts appearing on the network's viewer's poll that lost to The Grim Adventures of Billy & Mandy and Codename: Kids Next Door (except for Whatever Happened to... Robot Jones?) were added to the anthology. The show continued to air until October 16, 2003, when it was temporarily dropped from the network's schedule.

On September 12, 2005, The Cartoon Cartoon Show was revived, this time as a half-hour program featuring segments of older Cartoon Cartoons that were no longer shown regularly on the network, such as Cow and Chicken, I Am Weasel, and others. Some Cartoon Cartoons were moved exclusively to this show and the Top 5, though there was also some overlap with shows that already had regular half-hour slots outside the series. In 2006, the programming was expanded to also include non-Cartoon Cartoons that were regularly shown on the network, such as Foster's Home for Imaginary Friends, Camp Lazlo, My Gym Partner's a Monkey, and Squirrel Boy. The show ended on June 21, 2008.

In 2007, reruns of What a Cartoon! played briefly on Cartoon Network's retro animation sister channel, Boomerang.

In 2020, a selection of shorts were added to the Cartoon Network website and app.

Legacy 
What a Cartoon! is the first short cartoon incubator created by Fred Seibert. Starting with What a Cartoon! and continuing throughout his cartoon career, his Frederator Studios has persisted in the tradition of surfacing new talent, characters, and series with several cartoon shorts "incubators," including (as of 2016): What a Cartoon! (Cartoon Network, 1995), Nickelodeon/Nicktoons' own Oh Yeah! Cartoons (1998), Nicktoons Film Festival (2004), Random! Cartoons (2008), The Meth Minute 39 (Channel Frederator, 2008), The Cartoonstitute (Cartoon Network, 2009/unfinished), Too Cool! Cartoons (Cartoon Hangover, 2012), and GO! Cartoons (Cartoon Hangover, 2016). These laboratories have spun off notable series like: Dexter's Laboratory, The Powerpuff Girls, Johnny Bravo, Cow & Chicken, Family Guy, Courage the Cowardly Dog, Samurai Jack, The Grim Adventures of Billy & Mandy, Codename: Kids Next Door, The Fairly OddParents, My Life as a Teenage Robot, Nite Fite, The Mighty B!, Fanboy & Chum Chum, Adventure Time, Regular Show, Bravest Warriors, Secret Mountain Fort Awesome, Gravity Falls, Bee and PuppyCat, and Uncle Grandpa.

Dexter's Laboratory was the most popular short series according to a vote held in 1995 and eventually became the first spin-off of What a Cartoon! in 1996. Two more series based on shorts, Johnny Bravo and Cow and Chicken, premiered in 1997, and The Powerpuff Girls became a weekly half-hour show in 1998. Courage the Cowardly Dog (spun off from the Oscar-nominated short The Chicken from Outer Space) followed as the final spin-off in 1999. In addition, the Cow and Chicken short I Am Weasel eventually was also spun off into a separate series: in all, six cartoon series were ultimately launched by the What a Cartoon! project, any one of which earned enough money for the company to pay for the whole program. In addition to the eventual spin-offs, the What a Cartoon! short Larry and Steve by Seth MacFarlane featured prototypes of characters that would later go on to become MacFarlane's massively successful Family Guy.

The What a Cartoon! project and its assorted spin-offs brought Cartoon Network more commercial and critical success, and the network became an animation industry leader as the 1990s drew to a close. In 2001, coinciding with the death of William Hanna, Hanna-Barbera Productions absorbed into Warner Bros. Animation and Cartoon Network opened its own production arm, Cartoon Network Studios, in Burbank, as the rightful Hanna-Barbera successor to produce original programming for the network and future projects. Two What a Cartoon! shorts, Wind-Up Wolf and Hard Luck Duck, were the last cartoon shorts directed and produced by co-founder and co-chairman William Hanna. In addition, What a Cartoon! and spin-offs were the final original productions released by Hanna-Barbera.

Creator of The What a Cartoon! Show, Fred Seibert, left Hanna-Barbera in late 1996 to open up his own studio, Frederator Studios, and has persistently continued in the tradition of surfacing new talent, characters, and series with similar shorts "incubators", including (as of 2015) Oh Yeah! Cartoons (Nickelodeon, 1998), Nicktoons Film Festival (Nickelodeon, 2004), The Meth Minute 39 (Channel Frederator, 2008), Random! Cartoons (Nickelodeon/Nicktoons, 2008), Too Cool! Cartoons (Cartoon Hangover, 2012), and GO! Cartoons (Cartoon Hangover, 2016). Oh Yeah! Cartoons showcased What a Cartoon! alumni (Butch Hartman, Rob Renzetti) and launched several successful Nickelodeon series, including The Fairly OddParents, ChalkZone and My Life as a Teenage Robot. Frederator Studios also launched an animation film festival, Nicktoons Film Festival from 2004 to 2009; only to have The Mighty B! greenlit as a series based on the Super Scout short; though one short from Alex Hirsch would later go on to make Gravity Falls for Disney Channel/Disney XD. The studio launched another animation showcase in 2006, titled Random! Cartoons, which in turn produced Nickelodeon's Fanboy & Chum Chum in 2009, Cartoon Network's Adventure Time in 2010, and Cartoon Hangover's Bravest Warriors in 2012.

A sequel-of-sorts to the What a Cartoon! project, a Cartoon Network project titled The Cartoonstitute, was announced on April 3, 2008. Created by the channel executive Rob Sorcher and headed by The Powerpuff Girls creator Craig McCracken and My Life as a Teenage Robot creator Rob Renzetti, the project was to "establish a think tank and create an environment in which animators can create characters and stories", and also create new possible Cartoon Network series. However, the project was eventually scrapped as a result of the late 2000s recession and only 14 of the 39 planned were completed. Nevertheless, J. G. Quintel's Regular Show short and Peter Browngardt's Secret Mountain Fort Awesome were greenlit to become full series. A recurring character on the show, Uncle Grandpa, would get his own series two years later. The Big Cartoon DataBase cites What a Cartoon! as a "venture combining classic 1940s production methods with the originality, enthusiasm and comedy of the 1990s".

On April 15, 2021, Cartoon Network announced it debuted a new iteration of Cartoon Cartoons. The lineup of the first 9 shorts were announced on November 24, 2021: Accordions Geoffery & Mary Melodica by Louie Zong (of The Ghost and Molly McGee and We Bare Bears), Dang! It's Dracula by Levon Jihanian (of Tig n' Seek), Hungy Ghost by Jesse Moynihan, Fruit Stand at the End of the World by Rachel Liu, Off the Menu by Shavonne Cherry (of Ren and Stimpy and The Looney Tunes Show), Harmony in Despair by Andrew Dickman (of Looney Tunes Cartoons), Unravel by Alexis Sugden, Mouthwash Madness by Lisa Vandenberg (of Animaniacs), and Scaredy Cat by JJ Villard (of King Star King).

Filmography
Fred Seibert cartoon shorts filmography

List of shorts

Original show (1995–97) 
The following is a list of the original shorts produced under Fred Seibert's management for What a Cartoon! by Hanna-Barbera. The shorts are listed in the order that they originally aired.

The Cartoon Cartoon Show (1998–2002) 

After What a Cartoon! ended its run in 1997, Fred Seibert left Hanna-Barbera in 1997 to launch Frederator Studios. In 1998, Sam Register, who was Cartoon Network's vice president at the time, took over What a Cartoon!, and two years later, turned them into The Cartoon Cartoon Show. Register would later create Hi Hi Puffy AmiYumi for Cartoon Network in 2004. Two Cartoon Cartoon shorts were produced in 1998 and one in 1999. All Cartoon Cartoon shorts produced between 2000 and 2001 were entered in The Big Pick, a contest to choose the newest Cartoon Cartoon. The shorts premiered on Cartoon Cartoon Fridays in the weeks leading up to "The Big Pick" and the winner was revealed during the actual event. The winners were The Grim Adventures of Billy & Mandy, in 2000, and Codename: Kids Next Door, in 2001.

In 2002, eight new shorts premiered during the Cartoon Cartoon Weekend Summerfest. They did not compete against one another. These were the final Cartoon Cartoon shorts before the brand name was dropped. One short, LowBrow, was given its own series under the name Megas XLR.

Cartoon Cartoon segments 

From 2000 to 2003, The Cartoon Cartoon Show featured new episodes and reruns of the full-series Cartoon Cartoons (which were introduced in 2002 for the primetime hours), interspersed with premieres and reruns of the Cartoon Cartoon pilot shorts (some of which were retconned WAC! shorts). From 2005 to 2008, the block was revived, this time dropping the pilot shorts.

Episodes from each show were anthologized into 7 or 11-minute segments. This is a list of shows that were presented on the block:

 Dexter's Laboratory (2002–2003; 2005–2008)
 Johnny Bravo (2002–2003; 2005–2008)
 The Powerpuff Girls (2002–2003; 2005–2008)
 Cow and Chicken (2002–2003; 2005–2008)
 I Am Weasel (2002–2003; 2005–2006)
 Time Squad (2002–2003)
 Grim & Evil (2002–2003)
 Whatever Happened to... Robot Jones? (2002–2003; 2005–2006)
 The Grim Adventures of Billy & Mandy (2006–2008)
 Evil Con Carne (2005–2008)
 Foster's Home for Imaginary Friends (2006–2008)
 Hi Hi Puffy AmiYumi (2006)
 Camp Lazlo (2006–2008)
 My Gym Partner's a Monkey (2006–2008)
 Squirrel Boy (2006–2008)
 Ed, Edd n Eddy (2002–2003; 2005–2008)
 Mike, Lu & Og (2002–2003)
 Courage the Cowardly Dog (2002–2003; 2005–2008)
 Codename: Kids Next Door (2006–2008)

See also

 KaBlam! on Nickelodeon
 Oh Yeah! Cartoons on Nickelodeon
 Random! Cartoons on Nicktoons Network
 Shorty McShorts' Shorts – a Disney Channel Original Series of shorts on Disney Channel
 Raw Toonage – created by Disney and originally aired as part of CBS's Saturday Morning Line-up
 The Cartoonstitute – a cancelled spiritual successor that would have continued the What a Cartoon! format
 Liquid Television on MTV
 Cartoon Sushi on MTV
 Funpak on YTV

References

External links 
 
 
  at Frederator.com

1990s American animated television series
1990s American anthology television series
1990s American children's comedy television series
1990s American variety television series
1995 American television series debuts
1997 American television series endings
American children's animated anthology television series
American children's animated comedy television series
Cartoon Network original programming
Television series by Cartoon Network Studios
English-language television shows
Television series by Hanna-Barbera